Manchurians may refer to people inhabiting:
Manchuria, region of northeast Asia
Northeast China, part of Manchuria located in China
Manchukuo, short-lived state in Northeast China

Manchurians may also refer to:
Manchu people, ethnic group for whom Manchuria is named

See also
 Manchuria (disambiguation)
 Manchurian (disambiguation)
 Manchu (disambiguation)